Chandrala is a village in Krishna district of the Indian state of Andhra Pradesh. It is located in Gudlavalleru mandal of Gudivada revenue division.

Demographics
 census, Chandrala had a population of 1,519. The total population constitute, 772 males and 747 females —a sex ratio of 968 females per 1000 males. 140 children are in the age group of 0–6 years, of which 79 are boys and 61 are girls. The average literacy rate stands at 73.46% with 1,013 literates, significantly higher than the state average of 67.41%. It has a Government M.P.U.P.School, a Postal Office. Chandrala belongs to Mudinepalli Constituency Chandrala has also been selected as Indiramma Model Village.

Climate 

Chandrala falls in the hot humid region of the country and it is less than 32 miles from Bay of Bengal. The climate of this village is moderate and it is pleasant during the winter. The hottest day falls in the month of May with shift to June during some years. The maximum temperature observed is 55 °C and the minimum temperature observed is 09.8 °C.

See also 
Villages in Gudlavalleru mandal
Singaluru

References

Villages in Krishna district